Moravské Budějovice is a town in Třebíč District in the Vysočina Region of the Czech Republic. It has about 7,200 inhabitants. The historic town centre is well preserved and is protected by law as an urban monument zone.

Administrative parts
Villages of Jackov, Lažínky, Vesce and Vranín are administrative parts of Moravské Budějovice.

Geography
It lies in the Jevišovice Uplands. The Rokytka stream flows through the town. There are several ponds in the municipal territory.

History
Moravské Budějovice was probably founded in the 12th century. The first written mention of Budějovice is from 1231. In 1406, the name of Moravské ("Moravian") Budějovice was used for the first time, to distinguish it from České Budějovice in Bohemia. It gained town rights in 1498.

The town prospered until the Battle of White Mountain. In 1648, it was acquired by the Schaumburk family which did not respect the townspeople and their rights and caused the economic problems of the town. Moreover, in 1673 half of the town was destroyed by a large fire. In 1736, the Wallis family acquired Moravské Budějovice as a poor insignificant town. During their rule, the town slowly recovered.

Until 1918, Moravské Budějovice (as Mährisch Budwitz) was part of the Austrian monarchy (Austria side after the compromise of 1867), in the district with the same name, one of the 34 Bezirkshauptmannschaften in Moravia.

Demographics

Transport
The European route E59 from Jihlava to Znojmo passes through the town.

Sights

The Moravské Budějovice Castle was built for Count Rudolf Jindřich Schaumburk in the Renaissance style in the second half of the 17th century. Today it houses a museum of crafts, and castle stables are used for cultural purposes.

The historic centre contains several valuable burgher houses. Notable is the town hall, a Renaissance structure with Neoclassical elements.

The Church of Saint Giles is the landmark of the town. Originally it was probably a Romanesque structure from the first half of the 13th century. The tower is open to the public as a lookout tower. The Chapel of Saint Michael next to the church is originally a Romanesque rotunda from the 13th century. Its lower part served as an ossuary.

The Baroque building of the rectory dates from 1779. The rectory complex contains fragments of the town fortifications, including a bastion and a gate.

Notable people
Ralph Benatzky (1884–1957), Austrian composer
Miroslav Venhoda (1915–1987), choir conductor

Twin towns – sister cities

Moravské Budějovice is twinned with:
 Kalwaria Zebrzydowska, Poland
 Kautzen, Austria
 Pulkau, Austria
 Šaštín-Stráže, Slovakia

References

External links

Cities and towns in the Czech Republic
Populated places in Třebíč District